Alfred Preissler (9 April 1921 – 15 July 2003) was a German footballer and manager who played as a forward mostly for Borussia Dortmund.

The worker’s son grew up in Duisburg, in the local Dickelsbach settlement, which represents a remarkable chapter in German industrial history. He played for the club until 1944, before moving to Duisburger SpV and 1946 to Borussia Dortmund. With this club he won 
back-to-back German championships in 1956 and 1957. 

He also played two matches for the then West Germany national football team in 1951 against Austria and the Republic of Ireland.

References

External links

1921 births
2003 deaths
Footballers from Duisburg
German footballers
Germany international footballers
Association football forwards
Borussia Dortmund players
SC Preußen Münster players
Borussia Neunkirchen managers
German football managers